Ortoq may refer to:

Ortogh, a merchant partner of the Mongols and nomads
Artuk Bey, a Seljuk commander

See also
Muhammad Hashim Ortaq, en engineer and former politician of Afghanistan